USS H-9 (SS-152) was a H-class submarine originally built for the Imperial Russian Navy. Six of these were not delivered pending the outcome of the Russian Revolution of 1917 before being purchased by the United States Navy on 20 May 1918.

Description
They displaced  on the surface and  submerged. The boats had a crew of 2 officers and 23 enlisted men.

For surface running, they were powered by two New London Ship & Engine Co.  diesel engines, each driving one propeller shaft. When submerged each propeller was driven by a  Electro Dynamic Co. electric motor. They could reach  on the surface and  underwater.

The boats were armed with four 18 -nch (450 mm) torpedo tubes in the bow. They carried four reloads, for a total of eight torpedoes.

Construction and career
H-9 was launched on 23 November 1918 and commissioned on 25 November. Joining Submarine Division 6 (SubDiv 6) at San Pedro, Los Angeles, and later being transferred to SubDiv 7 there, H-9 participated in a variety of battle and training exercises along the West Coast. She also patrolled off Santa Catalina Island, and put in at Mare Island for periodic overhauls.

H-9 sailed from San Pedro on 25 July 1922 and arrived in Norfolk, Virginia on 14 September, with SubDivs 6 and 7. The submarine decommissioned at Norfolk on 3 November. Her name was struck from the Naval Vessel Register on 26 February 1931. She was sold for scrapping on 28 November 1933.

Notes

References

External links

United States H-class submarines
Ships built in Bremerton, Washington
1918 ships